David Geaney (born 1985 in County Kerry) is an Irish Gaelic footballer, formerly playing for Kerry and An Daingean and playing for St Peters Dunboyne since 2013.

Playing career

Schools
Geaney first became known while playing with Dingle CBS.

Club
At club level, he helped Dingle win the Intermediate county title with a win over West Kerry rivals Annascaul. He played in the Kerry Senior Football Championship, where Dingle lost to Dr Crokes in the final in 2012. He later joined Meath side, playing for St Peters, Dunboyne.

Underage
In 2003, he was part of the Kerry minor team. That seasons Munster Minor Football Championship had a round-robin phase and Geaney played in the first three games against Tipperary scoring 0-03, Limerick scoring 1-01 and Waterford scoring 0-02. He returned for the semi-final with Clare where he scored 0-04. Kerry faced Cork in the final where he scored 0-02 to pick up a Munster medal. He failed to score as Kerry overcame Mayo in the All-Ireland quarter-final. He was limited to a single point as Kerry lost out to Laois in the All-Ireland semi-final.   

He later moved on to the Under 21 team as a panel member but had little success as Kerry lost out to Cork in both 2005 and 2006.

Junior

He was part of the county Junior side in 2005. His first appearance was in the semi-final win over Limerick where he scored a point. He also appeared in the subsequent Munster final loss to Cork.

Senior

After a number of years away from intercounty football, he became part of the Kerry panel in 2011. He was part of the team that won the pre-season McGrath Cup after overcoming Clare in the final.

He made his first league appearance with 4 points against All-Ireland champions Cork, and went on to play 4 more games. He later made his championship debut against Limerick in the Minster semi-final. He played no part for the rest of the championship< including the All-Ireland final loss to Dublin. 

He played in the 2012 McGrath Cup but left the panel before the start of the league.

References

1985 births
Living people
Dingle Gaelic footballers
Kerry inter-county Gaelic footballers
St Peter's Dunboyne Gaelic footballers